Hit Pix 88 was a various artists "hits" collection album released in Australia in 1988 on the Festival Records (Cat No. 50013). The album spent 2 weeks at the top of the Australian album charts in 1988.

Track listing
Side 1
Belinda Carlisle - "Heaven Is a Place on Earth"
Kylie Minogue - "I Should Be So Lucky"
Richard Marx - "Should've Known Better"
Steve Winwood - "Valerie"
The Triffids - "Bury Me Deep in Love"
Icehouse - "Man of Colours"
Cliff Richard - "Some People"
M|A|R|R|S - "Pump Up the Volume"
Morris Minor and the Majors - "Stutter Rap"

Side 2
AC/DC - "Heatseeker"
The Choirboys - "Boys Will Be Boys"
James Reyne - "Rip It Up"
Paul Kelly - "Forty Miles to Saturday Night"
Martha Davis - "Don't Tell Me the Time"
Divinyls - "Back to the Wall"
Jimmy Barnes - "Driving Wheels"
Billy Idol - "Mony Mony"
The Angels - "Am I Ever Gonna See Your Face Again"

Charts

References

See also
 List of number-one albums in Australia during the 1980s

1988 compilation albums
Pop compilation albums
Rock compilation albums